Boca del Monte is a corregimiento in San Lorenzo District, Chiriquí Province, Panama. Its population as of 1990 was 1,539; its population as of 2000 was 1,990.

References

Corregimientos of Chiriquí Province